Elzie Clise Dudley (August 8, 1903 – January 12, 1989) was a pitcher in Major League Baseball. He pitched from 1929 to 1933. He attended the University of South Carolina.

On April 27, 1929, Dudley became only the second Major League player, and first pitcher, to hit a home run on the first pitch he ever saw. (Walter Mueller, an outfielder, was the first player to do so- in 1922.)  Despite the achievement, Brooklyn lost 8–3 to the Philadelphia Phillies.

See also
Home run in first Major League at-bat

External links

 Image print of Clise Dudley
 Rare newspaper story of the first-pitch home run
 Color photograph
 Another print of Clise

1903 births
1989 deaths
People from Graham, North Carolina
Baseball players from North Carolina
Major League Baseball pitchers
Brooklyn Robins players
Philadelphia Phillies players
Pittsburgh Pirates players
Greenville Spinners players
Spartanburg Spartans players
Atlanta Crackers players
Columbus Red Birds players
Chattanooga Lookouts players
Montreal Royals players
Baltimore Orioles (IL) players